The 2019 Virginia teachers' walkout (also known as RedForEd) is a teachers' walkout and protest that began on January 28, 2019, with teachers in Virginia walking out in protest of low school budgets and low teacher wages outside of Northern Virginia.

Background 
The walkout was influenced in part of the larger wave of teachers' strikes in the United States, especially in the wake of the teacher's strike in Los Angeles.

Response 
The Virginia House of Delegates' leadership proposed in the 2019–20 fiscal budget a five percent pay raise for teachers across the Commonwealth.

See also 
 VCUarts adjunct workers' protests

References

External links 
 

2019 in Virginia
2019 labor disputes and strikes
Education labor disputes in the United States
January 2019 events in the United States
Labor disputes in Virginia